General Henrique Teles Carreira (June 2, 1933 – May 30, 2000), best known by the nickname Iko Carreira, served as the first Defense Minister of Angola from 1975 to 1980 during the civil war. After the death of Agostinho Neto his position in the party weakened. He later served as ambassador to Algeria and military attaché to Spain.

He was born to civil servants in Angola. He joined the Independence Movement in 1957 and went underground in 1964, moving to Zambia and Algeria to receive training from military training. He was an officer in the People's Movement for the Liberation of Angola (MPLA), Agostinho Neto's armed wing fighting against Portuguese colonial apartheid like rule. Founder and commander in chief of the Angolan Armed Forces, he defeated the FNLA in the north and UNITA in the south during the first civil war. Considered to be the regime's second in command until Neto's death, he was the first African military officer to receive a degree as a general from a Soviet military academy.

General Iko Carreira's last struggle was to combat his illness, a stroke that paralysed his entire left side for the last 13 years of his life, writing two novels with one finger, on a special computer. The novels are titled: O Pensamento Estrategico de Agostinho Neto (Publicacoes Dom Quixote), and Memorias (published in Angola by Nzila). In June 2000, The Guardians Victoria Brittain wrote in an obituary : "Like his friend and mentor, President Neto, Carreira will always remain a reference point for Angolans for the heroic period of their history."

References

1933 births
2000 deaths
Angolan people of Portuguese descent
Angolan military personnel
People of the Angolan Civil War
Angolan communists
MPLA politicians
Defence ministers of Angola
Ambassadors of Angola to Algeria